Gmajna is a dispersed settlement in the City Municipality of Slovenj Gradec in northern Slovenia. It lies in the hills northwest of the town of Slovenj Gradec. The area is part of the traditional region of Styria. The entire municipality is now included in the Carinthia Statistical Region.

Name
The name Gmajna means 'commons', referring to land that was jointly owned and used by the village community. The Slovenian common noun gmajna is a borrowing from Middle High German gemeine, with the same meaning, and is found in other Slovene toponyms such as Gmajna near Krško as well as in the diminutive form Gmajnica.

Unmarked grave
Gmajna is the site of an unmarked grave associated with the Second World War. It contains the remains of a Croatian soldier.

References

External links
Gmajna at Geopedia

Populated places in the City Municipality of Slovenj Gradec
Slovenj Gradec